Volkoff may refer to:

 Alexandre Volkoff, Russian director, actor
 George Volkoff, Canadian physicist of Russian origin
 Igor Volkoff, ring name of a French Canadian professional wrestler
 Nikolai Volkoff, ring name of an American professional wrestler of Yugoslav origin
 Vladimir Volkoff, French writer of Russian extraction
Volkoff Industries, a criminal organization on the TV series Chuck
Alexei Volkoff, an international weapons dealer portrayed by Timothy Dalton

See also
 Volkov

fr:Volkoff